Cultural Anthropology is a quarterly peer-reviewed academic journal published by the American Anthropological Association on behalf of the Society for Cultural Anthropology. It was established in 1986 and covers emerging areas of anthropology. In 2014, it became open access. The editors-in-chief are Dominic Boyer, James D. Faubion, and Cymene Howe (Rice University).

Abstracting and indexing 
The journal is abstracted and indexed in Current Contents/Social & Behavioral Sciences, Scopus, and the Social Sciences Citation Index. According to the Journal Citation Reports, the journal has a 2013 impact factor of 1.606.

References

External links 
 

Anthropology journals
Quarterly journals
English-language journals
Open access journals
Publications established in 1986
Academic journals published by learned and professional societies